George Curtis Cameron is an American soul and R&B singer who is currently married to singer Linda Dixon Cameron a.k.a. “Lady L.”.  Perhaps best known as the lead singer of The Spinners on their 1970 hit "It's a Shame" and for his 1975 hit "It's So Hard to Say Goodbye to Yesterday". Cameron is credited with having "six different voices."

The Spinners
After serving in the Vietnam War with the Marines, Cameron joined  Motown act The Spinners as lead singer (though original lead singer Bobby Smith also retained his lead position).  He sang both lead parts on their first big hit, 1970's "It's a Shame", co-written and produced by Stevie Wonder.  However, when The Spinners left Motown the following year, Cameron remained with Motown as a solo artist.

Cameron rejoined The Spinners in 2000, after then-current frontman John Edwards suffered a stroke. He remained with The Spinners well into the early 2000s, during which time he appeared with them on a PBS music special, singing his 1970 hit "It's A Shame", before leaving again to join The Temptations in 2003.

Solo artist
Releasing several solo singles in the early 1970s, he became known for his ability to sound like other artists, such as Smokey Robinson on his song "(Don't Wanna) Play Pajama Games", Curtis Mayfield on "No Matter Where" and The Isley Brothers on his duet with Willie Hutch "Come Get This Thang". Although Cameron was not a major-seller for the label, he did have a hit with "It's So Hard to Say Goodbye to Yesterday", the theme song of the 1975 film Cooley High, which was later covered by Boyz II Men.

Cameron left Motown after the 1970s, and toured as an independent artist. He recorded a critically acclaimed album for Malaco Records in 1983 and his career was revived in 1989 by recordings for British record companies Ardent (owned at the time by Paul Mooney) and Motorcity (owned by Ian Levine). He also recorded another solo album titled Shadows. Shadows was co-produced by Ben Obi of Savannah Street Music.

The Temptations, 2003-2007, 2019

Today
On Saturday, May 17, 2008, Cameron made a special guest appearance at a benefit concert for Hold on to Education Foundation Inc. in South Jersey. He received proclamations from New Jersey State Senator Diane Allen; and Mayor Jacqueline Jennings, with Councilman Eddie Campbell, Jr. of Willingboro, New Jersey. Cherry Hill High School West Acappella vocal group Men of Note and Ms. Marilyn Marshall paid tribute to Cameron in honor of his contribution to American Popular Music and his dedication to youth education. In late 2008, he appeared on the PBS special Love Train: The Sound of Philadelphia, singing The Spinners' hit "The Rubberband Man".

In 2008, G.C. Cameron began working with reggae band Dub Nation on their album Rising Force For Change. Released in early 2012, the album features reggae renditions of Cameron's hits "It's A Shame" and "It's So Hard to Say Goodbye to Yesterday" as well as a collection of new songs.

In 2009, G.C. Cameron released the album Enticed Ecstasy.

Discography
1971: "Act Like a Shotgun"
1972: "Don't Wanna Play Pajama Games"
1973: "No Matter Where"
1974: "Let Me Down Easy"
1974: Love Songs & Other Tragedies
1974: "Topics"
1975: "It's So Hard to Say Goodbye to Yesterday"
1976: G.C. Cameron
1977: You're What's Missing in My Life
1977: Rich Love, Poor Love with Syreeta
1983: Give Me Your Love
1991: Right or Wrong
2001: Shadows
2009: Enticed Ecstasy
2012:  Rising Force for Change with Dub Nation

References

External links
An interview with Soul Express in October 2018

Living people
Motown artists
Musicians from Jackson, Mississippi
American soul singers
20th-century African-American male singers
The Temptations members
The Spinners (American group) members
People from Franklin County, Mississippi
21st-century African-American male singers
1945 births